The Department of Higher Education, abbreviated JPT, is a department of the ministry that is responsible for higher education. Its main office is in Putrajaya.

Key legislation
The Department of Higher Education is responsible for administration of several key Acts:

Background
The functions of the JPT was originally within the purview of the Ministry of Education (MOE) until the departments and agencies responsible for higher education were separated from the MOE on 27 March 2004 and established as a full ministry under a Federal Minister. In 2013, the Prime Minister, Najib Razak, merged the Ministry of Education and the Ministry of Higher Education into a single Ministry of Education. In 2015, the Ministry is reestablished.

Organisation
The JPT is headed by the Director General of Higher Education, YBhg. Datin Paduka Ir. Dr. Siti Hamisah binti Tapsir. The Director General is assisted by two deputies, YBrs. Dr. Mohd Nor Azman bin Hassan whom will oversees the affairs of Private Higher Education Institutions (Private HEIs) while the post for the second is currently vacant.

The following divisions and centres are under the purview of the JPT:

Management Services Division
 (BKPJPT), is headed by its Director, Puan Norhazimah binti Che Hassan. BKPJPT provides support services to the Department of Higher Education (JPT) so that the management and operation of the department implemented effectively, efficiently, with integrity, systematic and customer-friendly.

Industrial Relations Division
 (BHI), is headed by its Director, YBhg. Prof. Madya Dr. Arham bin Abdullah. The primary function of BHI is to encourage and intensify the collaboration between academia, industry, government and community. This is to ensure the goal outlined in Shift 1, Shift 2, Shift 4 and Shift 7 of the Malaysian Education Blueprint 2015-2025 (Higher Education) can be met successfully.

HEI Excellence Planning Division
 (BPKI), is headed by its Director, YBhg. Prof. Dr. Raha binti Abdul Rahim. BPKI spearheading Shift 7 of the Malaysian Education Blueprint 2015-2025 (Higher Education) in research and innovation. BPKI aims to build and strengthen the capacity of research and development (R&D) in HEI in order to propel Malaysia towards a high-income country based on knowledge, innovation and creativity by 2020.

Student Development Division
 (BPMs), is headed by its Director, YBhg. Prof. Madya Dr. Sopian bin Bujang. BPMs plan and coordinate the foundation of personality development strategy, partriotisme and national unity among students in Malaysia in order to develop a balance student in terms of knowledge and morals in line with national aspirations.

Academic Development Management Division
 (BPPA), is headed by its Director, Dr. Aishah binti Abu Bakar. BPPA responsible for planning, coordinating and implementing the national policy decisions related to programs and academic direction in Public Higher Education Institutions (Public HEI) in Malaysia. The main goal of this section to ensure that the Public HEI receives quality and timely services for all matters related to academic that requires ministry intervention.

Public HEI Governance Division
 (BGA), the division is headed by its Director, Cik Norina binti Jamaludin. BGA studies, drafts, updating and enforcing acts related to higher education. In addition, the division manages the appointment of Public HEI key officials and members of National Higher Education Council. The division is also involved in formulating, implementing, monitoring and evaluating policies, programs and activities of Public HEIs.

Private HEI Governance Division
 (BGS), is headed by its Director, YBrs. Dr. Mohamed Ali bin Hj. Abdul Rahman. BGS main role is in the governance of Private HEIs through regulations and Private Higher Education Act (Act 555). BGS play an important role in ensuring that the quality in the services, control of resources and control practices can be preserved.

Education Malaysia Division
(BEM) is headed by its Director, Encik Jamalulail bin Abu Bakar. In addition, the BEM is also responsible for supervising and monitoring the affairs of Malaysian students through the facilities and services provided by Education Malaysia (EM) offices in overseas; processing No Objection Ceritificate (NOC) application and the application of Malaysian students who wants to study in the Middle East.

Private Standards Division
 (BSS), is headed by its Director, Puan Aidawati binti Misdar. BSS is tasked with the management the Private HEI application as well as helping to improve the quality and sustainability of Private HEI. Part of the role is to ensure that the quality of education offered by private higher education sector is world-class and relevant to; the needs of the country against the expansion of access to tertiary education; the need to improve the quality of learning and teaching; diversity of service delivery; changes in the method of financing and investment in higher education. In addition, the BSS is also responsible to ensure Private HEIs has a quality management system in accordance with the prescribed standards.

Enforcement and Inspectorate Division
 (BPI), is headed by its Director, Encik Rahman bin Mohd Din. BPI responsible for ensuring the quality and standards of Private Higher Education Institutions (Private HEIs) system remains strong and able to gain international recognition in accordance with the provisions of the Private Higher Education Act (Act 555).

Student Admission Management Division
 (BPKP), is headed by its Director, Puan Mazula binti Sabudin. Formerly known as UPU, BPKP serve as planners, managers, coordinators in making and implementing policy, procedures and conditions for student admission into Public Higher Education Institutions (Public HEIs). In addition, BPKP acts as a local recruitment centre (PPS) to manage SPM / equivalent school leavers for a place in public universities, polytechnics, community colleges and civil skills training institutes (ILKA) based on the results of the Cabinet meeting.

Malaysia Citation Centre
 (PSM), is headed by its Director, YBhg. Prof. Madya Dr. Zuraidah binti Abd Manaf. Better known as MCC, PSM envision to become the national centre for indexing bibliometrics and citation analysis of scientific publications from researchers in Malaysia.

List of Director General of Higher Education

The following is a list of former and current Director General of Higher Education.

See also
 Education in Malaysia

References

External links
 
 Education Malaysia Division website
 Student Admission Management Division website
 Malaysia Citation Centre website

Education in Malaysia
Malaysia
Higher Education
Malaysia, Higher Education
Ministry of Higher Education (Malaysia)